Rhysodinae is a subfamily (sometimes called wrinkled bark beetles) in the family Carabidae. There are 19 genera and at least 380 described species in Rhysodinae. The group of genera making up Rhysodinae had been treated as the family Rhysodidae in the past, and subsequent DNA analysis then placed it within Carabidae, where it was sometimes treated as the tribe Rhysodini, but the most recent analyses place it as a subfamily in a clade along with subfamilies Paussinae and Siagoninae, forming a sister to the remaining Carabidae.

Description
These beetles are elongate, in size ranging from 5–8 mm, and color ranging from a reddish brown to black. Both the thorax and the elytra are deeply grooved lengthwise, thus giving these beetles their common name. The head is also grooved, and posteriorly constricted into a short but visible "neck". The 11-segment antennae are short, resembling a string of beads, while the mandibles lack cutting edges and are thus nonfunctional. The front legs are short and strongly built.

Adults and larvae live in moist rotten wood that is infested with slime moulds, which are believed to be their diet. Instead of using their mandibles to bite, they use the anterior edge of the mentum and swivel their heads to cut off pieces of food. Adults do not make burrows, instead just squeezing between the cell layers of the decomposed wood, generally leaving no visible trace of their passage, while larvae live in short tunnels.

They occur on all continents with forested areas, the richest fauna being found in New Guinea, Indonesia, the Philippines, and northern South America.

Genera

Tribe Clinidiini R.T. & J.R.Bell, 1978
 Clinidium Kirby, 1830
 Grouvellina R.T. & J.R.Bell, 1978
 Rhyzodiastes Fairmaire, 1895
Tribe Dhysorini R.T. & J.R.Bell, 1978
 Dhysores Grouvelle, 1903
 Neodhysores R.T. & J.R.Bell, 1978
 Tangarona R.T. & J.R.Bell, 1982
Tribe Leoglymmiini R.T. & J.R.Bell, 1978
 Leoglymmius R.T. & J.R.Bell, 1978
Tribe Medisorini R.T. & J.R.Bell, 1987
 Medisores R.T. & J.R.Bell, 1987
Tribe Omoglymmiini R.T. & J.R.Bell, 1978
 Arrowina R.T. Bell & J.R. Bell, 1978
 Omoglymmius Ganglbauer, 1891
 Plesioglymmius R.T. & J.R.Bell, 1978
 Shyrodes Grouvelle, 1903
 Srimara R.T. & J.R.Bell, 1978
 Xhosores R.T. & J.R.Bell, 1978
 Yamatosa R.T. & J.R.Bell, 1979
Tribe Rhysodini Laporte, 1840
 Kaveinga R.T. & J.R.Bell, 1978
 Kupeus R.T. & J.R.Bell, 1982
 Rhysodes Germar, 1822
Tribe Sloanoglymmiini R.T. & J.R.Bell, 1991
 Sloanoglymmius R.T. & J.R.Bell, 1991

References

 
Adephaga